The Aubert Library is a library located in Oran, Algeria. It holds 26,000 volumes.

See also 
 List of libraries in Algeria

References 

Libraries in Algeria
Public libraries in Algeria
State libraries of Algeria
Buildings and structures in Oran